The women's pole vault at the 2017 World Championships in Athletics was held at the Olympic Stadium on 4 and 6 August.

Summary
It essentially took a clearance at 4.50 metres to make it into the final. The one clearance (with earlier misses) brought 13 still in at 4.55 metres each thinking there was more work to do. Lisa Ryzih, Sandi Morris and Robeilys Peinado remained perfect at 4.55 metres, with Olympic Champion Katerina Stefanidi passing all the way until the automatic qualifier height of 4.60 metres.

In the final, four women were perfect to 4.55 metres including home team favourite, Holly Bradshaw, Yarisley Silva, Peinado and Morris with Stefanidi again still passing. At Stefanidi's starting height 4.65 meters, she cleared on her first attempt and was only matched with a perfect round by Morris. Ryzih, Peinado and Silva all missed once before clearing. Ryzih's earlier miss at 4.45 metres dropping out of the tie that defined the tied bronze medalists as none of them could go any higher. So it was a repeat battle from the Olympics. Morris and Stefanidi still perfect over 4.75 metres. At 4.82 metres, Morris missed but Stefanidi made it. Morris passed to try 4.89 metres for the win, but she couldn't make it. Neither did Stefanidi, but she really didn't need to. After Morris missed her last attempt, Stefanidi passed to 4.91 metres, which she made on her first attempt for a national record, stamping an exclamation point on her win. Stefanidi then moved the bar up to 5.02 metres try to join Morris and become the fourth woman over 5 metres and set a new championship record, but she missed all three attempts.

Records
Before the competition records were as follows:

The following records were set at the competition:

Qualification standard
The standard to qualify automatically for entry was 4.55 metres.

Schedule
The event schedule, in local time (UTC+1), was as follows:

Results

Qualification
The qualification round took place on 4 August, in two groups, with Group A starting at 19:50 and Group B starting at 19:49. Athletes attaining a mark of 4.60 metres ( Q ) or at least the 12 best performers ( q ) qualified for the final. The overall results were as follows:

Final
The final took place on 6 August at 19:01. The results were as follows:

References

Pole vault
Pole vault at the World Athletics Championships
2017 in women's athletics